The 1930 Temple Owls football team was an American football team that represented Temple University as an independent during the 1930 college football season. In its sixth season under head coach Heinie Miller, the team compiled a 7–3 record.

Schedule

References

Temple
Temple Owls football seasons
Temple Owls football